Pseuderanthemum variabile, commonly known as pastel flower or love flower in its native range, or night and afternoon in the USA, is a small perennial herb in the family Acanthaceae which is native to Australia, Papua New Guinea and New Caledonia. It can be an unwelcome nuisance in orchid nurseries in Australia.

Description
The leaves are lanceolate to ovate in shape with entire margins, and their arrangement is opposite and decussate.

The leaf colour varies greatly. The upper surface is usually dark green to mid-green, but may have varying amounts of light grey or (rarely) purple patterning. The lower surface of the leaf is usually light green but may also be purple or dark red (see gallery for examples).

The inflorescence is produced from the terminal axil, and the zygomorphic flowers have five petals. Two petals are smaller than the others and are usually uppermost. Two more are held perpendicular to the first pair, one on either side, and the last (and largest) petal is opposite the first pair. The petals may be any colour shade from white to pink or lilac.

Taxonomy
The basionym of this species is Eranthemum variabile which was first described by the Scottish botanist Robert Brown in his book Prodromus Florae Novae Hollandiae et Insulae Van Diemen published in 1810. In 1883 the German taxonomist and botanist  Ludwig Radlkofer transferred a number of species, including E. variablile, to the new genus Pseuderanthemum.

Distribution and habitat
This species is found in Papua New Guinea, eastern parts of New South Wales and Queensland in Australia, and in New Caledonia. It may occupy a number of forest types in Australia, most often rainforest and wet sclerophyll forest, but also woodlands, open forest and deciduous vine thickets.

It has been introduced to Florida, South Carolina and Puerto Rico.

Ecology 
P. variabile is the food plant for caterpillars of a number of butterflies in the family Nymphalidae, including Doleschallia bisaltide, Hypolimnas alimena, Hypolimnas bolina, Hypolimnas misippus and Junonia orithya.

Conservation
This species is listed by the Queensland Department of Environment and Science as least concern. , it has not been assessed by the IUCN.

Cultivation and uses
It is an attractive addition to gardens, and can be used as a feature, a ground cover, or a gap filler in a rockery. It is easily grown from seed or cuttings.

In Australia, it is reported by some orchid nurseries as a pest, as it often appears in pots and may be difficult to eradicate.

Gallery

References

External links
 
 
 View a map of recorded sightings of this species at the Australasian Virtual Herbarium
 View observations of this species on iNaturalist
 See images of this species on Flickriver

Flora of the Northern Territory
Flora of Queensland
Flora of New South Wales
Flora of New Guinea
Flora of New Caledonia
variabile
Garden plants